News.nl was a free Dutch tabloid-sized newspaper which was launched at the end of 2000 by De Telegraaf. The responsible editor was Frank Volmer

As opposed to Metro and Sp!ts (also released by De Telegraaf) it was an evening paper aimed at a more adult public than Sp!ts.

Next to the articles there was a code which could be entered on the website of News.nl, where one could find links with more information about the article.

On 4 April 2001 News.nl was terminated.

References

External links
  News.nl website dated 13 October 2000 at the Wayback Machine

Defunct Dutch websites
Defunct newspapers published in the Netherlands
Dutch-language newspapers
Dutch-language websites
Internet properties established in 2000
Internet properties disestablished in 2001
Newspapers established in 2000
Publications disestablished in 2001
Daily newspapers published in the Netherlands